Boris Dragičević (born 10 September 1958 in Rijeka) is a former Croatian handball player and coach.

He played for RK Zamet for 13 years. He was part of the RK Zamet squad that were vice-champions in 1992.

Honours

As player
RK Zamet
Yugoslav Second League (1): 1986-87

As a coach
RK Zamet II
Croatian Handball Championship U-19 (1): 1996
Croatian Handball Championship U-18 :Third place (1): 1994

References

Croatian male handball players
RK Zamet players
RK Zamet coaches
ŽRK Zamet coaches
Yugoslav male handball players
Handball players from Rijeka
1958 births
Living people
Croatian handball coaches